Jatin Bora (born 25 April 1970) is an Indian actor and director who has appeared in Assamese language films since 1989. He is also an actor and director in some mobile theatre groups of Assam, including Aabahan, Hengool, Ashirbaad, Bhagyadevi, Kohinoor, Itihas and Surjya.

Early life 

Jatin Bora was born to Sri Gakul Chandra Bora and Premolata Bora, in Kacholukhowa village, Nagaon, Assam. He did his primary schooling in Marikalang Prathamik Vidyalaya. As a child he used to take part in Navajyoti Sangha Maina Parijat, a weekly children's cultural meet, near his village. He was taught the nuances of Bhaona, the traditional Assamese drama, as a child.

He completed his schooling at Dawson Higher Secondary and Multi Purpose School and began his college education from the Nagaon GNDG Commerce College, later graduating from Nowgong College.

His first stage performance was Lakshminath Bezbaroa’s Mukti when he was a student of class V.

Bora is a diploma holder in Fine Arts from the Kallol Art School in Nagaon. He learned music from childhood, and is a ‘Visharad’ in tabla. He was trained in Assamese classical Sattriya dance by Rabin Chandra Das of Nagaon, and performed in Bhaonas during his childhood. In these Sattriya ekankika naats and the locally organised "Raas" festivals, he was often selected to play the role of Lord Krishna.

Career

Films
Although he had a minor role in Kolahal, his first professional film, Jatin Bora officially debuted in Uttarkaal (1989) (opposite Moloya Goswami). The movie was successful, and Jatin became a star of the Assamese cinema.

After Uttarkal, Bora acted in several plays for Doordarshan. He featured in the teleserials like Biju Phukan’s Deuta, Chandra Talukdar’s Namgharia, Birina Paator Anguthee, Jones Mahalia's Pratighat, Surangor Majere, and Ghat-Pratighat. In 1993 he had a role in the film I Killed Him Sir.

He was commercially successful in Munin Barua's romantic drama film Hiya Diya Niya in 2000, opposite debutante Luna Lahkar. The best known songs of the movie were "Nohole porichoy" and "Mitha Mitha Aji Xopunote" by Zubeen Garg.

In the same year, he also appeared in a negative role in Zubeen Garg debut directed film Tumi Mur Mathu Mur.

After that he appeared in back to back many films of Munin Barua, like Nayak, Kanyadaan, Daag, Bidhata etc. 2001 romance film Nayak (with co-stars Zerifa Wahid and Ravi Sarma) was one of the biggest hits in his career. In Kanyadaan, he acted along with Mridula Baruah and Chetana Das. He also had performances in the films like, Agnisakhi, Kadambari, Suren Suror Putek etc.

In 2003, he appeared in Munin Barua's highly acclaimed film Bidhata, which was said to be an Assamese adaptation of the Bollywood movie Anand.

He began his directorial career in 2006 with a film called Adhinayak. This film was extensively shot in Barapani, Cherrapunji and in and around Guwahati.

Later in 2019 he directed and acted as the lead in the movie Ratnakar.

Mobile theatre
He joined Hengool Theatre in 1994. In the following year he got an offer from Abahon Theatre, then for the 1995-96 season. He continues to be actively involved in Assamese moving theatre industry. He acted in their plays written for Abahon. In 1997, Dr Bhabedranath Saikia cast him for his first and only Hindi film Kaal Sandhya.

In 2000s and 2010s, he was associated with Ashirbad Theatre (2004-05/2010-11), Kohinoor Theatre (2007-08/2008-09/2009-10), Theatre Bhagyadevi (2006-07/2011-12/2012-13), Itihas Theatre (2013–14), Brindabon Theatre (2014–15), Rajtilak Theatre (2015–16). In 2016–17 and 2017–18,  he was with Theatre Surjya.

Awards
Bora won the Jyotirupa Joint Media Award for Excellence in Film Television & Music (for Hiya Diya Niya, Nayak, Bidhata, Maa tumi Ananya, Suren Suror Putek), Natasurya Phani Sarma Award (a government of Assam award for Juwe Pura Xun), NE TV people's choice for Kadambari and Maa tumi Ananya, Prag Cine award "Best Actor" for Kadambari in 2005, Moonlight media award for Hiya Diya Niya, Nayak, Kanyadaan and Bidhata.

Filmography

Personal life
On 25 October 2002, Bora married Navanita Sharma, a singer (trained under Sudesh Wadkar, Mumbai) and actress from Nagaon. They have a son and a daughter, Drishan and Aastha.

References 

Sumi Borah

External links
 
 
 Jatin Bora launcheswebsite , The Assam Tribune, 28 April 2009.

Living people
Male actors in Assamese cinema
Male actors from Assam
People from Nagaon district
1970 births
20th-century Indian male actors
21st-century Indian male actors
Indian male film actors